The 8.35 cm PL kanon vz. 22 (Anti-aircraft Gun Model 22) was a Czech anti-aircraft gun used during World War II. Those weapons captured after the German occupation of Czechoslovakia in March 1939 were taken into Wehrmacht service as the 8.35 cm Flak 22(t). Some guns were reportedly captured in Yugoslavia as well. 144 were in Czech service during the Munich Crisis in September 1938 of which Slovakia seized between twenty-five and twenty-nine when it declared independence six months later. One hundred seven were in German service in August 1943, declining to twenty by October 1944.

Description
The PLK vz. 22 was mounted on a pedestal which was fixed to a circular firing platform that was mounted on a wheeled carriage. It was fired from the carriage once the side outriggers were swung into position to support the carriage.

Notes

References

External links

Anti-aircraft guns of Czechoslovakia
World War II anti-aircraft guns
83 mm artillery
Military equipment introduced in the 1920s